McAninch is a surname. Notable people with the surname include:

 Amy McAninch (born 1975), Canadian curler
 Bruce McAninch (born 1950), Canadian curler

See also
 Cal MacAninch (born 1963), Scottish actor